Michel Marmin (born 18 November 1943) is a French journalist and film critic.

Biography 
Born 18 November 1943, Michel Marmin was a member of the non-religious scouting association Éclaireurs de France in the 1950s. He attended the Institut des hautes études cinématographiques.

Marmin is aligned with the neopagan faction of the French New Right. In 1971, he was recruited by media entrepreneur Raymond Bourgine and began to work as a cinema critic for Valeurs Actuelles (1972–1978). Upon the public launch of GRECE's magazine Éléments in September 1973, Marmin became its first president, followed by Pierre Vial in 1983. He also served as the deputy secretary general of GRECE, in charge of press relations.

In September 1976, he co-founded the publishing house Copernic. Between 1991 and 1992, he served as the president of GRECE. 

In 2012–2013, Marmin was among the sponsors of TV Libertés, a far-right web TV.

References 

 Bibliography
 

1942 births
New Right (Europe)
Living people
French journalists
French film critics
French modern pagans